Jim Early (some sources give the first name of Thomas and family name of "Earlie") was a 25-year-old African-American man who was lynched in Plantersville, Grimes County, Texas, by a mob on May 17, 1922. According to the United States Senate Committee on the Judiciary it was the 24th of 61 lynchings during 1922 in the United States.

Background
Described as a "half-wit", Early was raised in nearby Montgomery County, Texas, but had moved to West Texas several years earlier. He had apparently returned to the region and on Monday, May 15, 1922, officers arrested Early after reports of a white girl screaming that she was being attacked were heard. He was placed in a jail in Anderson, Texas but being familiar with jail locks escaped on May 16, 1922.

Lynching

An official posse was formed but a mob caught and lynched him on the night of May 17, 1922, or the early morning of May 18, 1922. His body was found hanging from a big oak tree.

Bibliography 
Notes
 

 

1922 riots
1922 in Texas
African-American history of Texas
Lynching deaths in Texas 
February 1922 events
Protest-related deaths
Racially motivated violence against African Americans 
Riots and civil disorder in Texas 
White American riots in the United States